Lake Nuijamaa is a lake on the border between Finland and Russia next to the town of Nuijamaa.

It is part of the Saimaa Canal linking Vyborg Bay in the Baltic Sea to Lake Saimaa in the Finnish Lakeland.

Lakes of the Republic of Karelia
International lakes of Europe
Lakes of Lappeenranta